James D. and Frances Sprunt Cottage is a historic beach cottage located at Wrightsville Beach, New Hanover County, North Carolina. It was built in 1937, and is an elevated two-story, three-bay frame cottage.  It features a gable-front roof with exposed rafter tails, a main-level porch with an upper deck, and a double-tier wraparound porch.  The ground level includes a two-car garage.

It was listed on the National Register of Historic Places in 2013.

References

Houses on the National Register of Historic Places in North Carolina
Houses completed in 1937
Houses in New Hanover County, North Carolina
National Register of Historic Places in New Hanover County, North Carolina